The Persian Wildlife Heritage Foundation (PWHF) is an Iranian conservationist organization which studies and protects the endangered asiatic cheetah. Iranian-American businessman Morad Tahbaz is a co-founder of group. In January 2018, Iranian authorities arrested Tahbaz along with eight other PWHF-affiliated individuals, including Niloufar Bayani.

A group of environmentalists founded PWHF in 2008 to address concern over the dwindling number of asiatic cheetahs. PWHF operated with the permission of the Iranian government and worked closely with Iran's Department of Environment.

See also 
 Niloufar Bayani
 Human rights in Iran

References

External links
 

Nature conservation in Iran
Cat conservation organizations
2008 establishments in Iran